DZBB (pronounced DZ-double-B; 594 AM) Super Radyo is a radio station owned and operated by GMA Network. It serves as the flagship station of the Super Radyo network and one of the assets of RGMA Network and GMA Integrated News. The station's studio is located at the 3rd floor of GMA Network Studio Annex, GMA Network Complex, in Quezon City, while its transmitter is located along Camia St., Brgy. Panghulo, Obando, Bulacan. 

Cable company Spectrum broadcasts the audio of DZBB along with that of Barangay LS 97.1 to the United States as part of its "Filipino Channels" package

History

1950–1989: Dobol B
DZBB marked its inaugural broadcast, as the station's static marred signal was wafted on the air for the first time on March 1, 1950, by Robert "Uncle Bob" Stewart, in a small office space in Calvo Building, Escolta, Binondo, Manila, with mostly second-hand equipment and an old, surplus radio transmitter. The station was then broadcasting on the frequency of 580 kHz, with the power of 10,000 watts.

Despite the scarcity of new broadcasting facilities, the station has scored many milestones with its news, Congressional coverage, breaking news, exclusives, and blow-by-blow accounts of major national events. It was also a pioneer with trendsetting shows such as Camay Theater of the Air, Cathay Broadcasting, Lovingly Yours, Helen, Kahapon Lamang, Tawag ng Tanghalan, Newscoop, and Kwentong Kutsero. Some of these shows eventually became television shows. DZBB was also the first to air live coverage of not only news and public affairs, but also entertainment and educational programmes.

In 1957, DZBB moved to its new and current home at EDSA, Quezon City.

Due to the success of DZBB, Stewart ventured into television on October 29, 1961, as DZBB-TV Channel 7 with the branding of RBS-7 (now known as GMA-7 Manila). The station was seized and closed in September 1972 due to Martial Law pursuant to Proclamation No. 1081. Two years later, due to changes in media ownership laws, Channel 7, DZBB and their other sister provincial radio and television stations were eventually sold to the triumvirate of Gilberto Duavit Sr., Menardo Jimenez and Felipe Gozon. At the same time, DZBB returned to the airwaves under the branding "Dobol B", which would later be rebranded to simply DZBB 594 kHz; and became a music-personality radio station. The station also covered major news stories in the 1970s and 1980s. In November 1978, DZBB moved to the present frequency of 594 kHz, in response to the adoption of the 9 kHz spacing on AM radio stations in the Philippines under the Geneva Frequency Plan of 1975.

1989–1999: Bisig Bayan

The station was rebranded as "Bisig Bayan" from July 17, 1989, to January 3, 1999; and completely changed its format to news and public service. Their new identity made the station more popular to radio listeners in Metro Manila. Rafael "Paeng" Yabut, Bobby Guanzon, Lito Villarosa, Rene Jose, Rey Pacheco, Raul Virtudazo, Jimmy Gil, Arman Roque, Rose "Manang Rose" Clores, German Moreno, Inday Badiday, Helen Vela, Augusto Victa, Manolo Favis, and Pol Caguiat were the personalities of the Bisig Bayan years.

Also on January 1, 1990, DZBB evolved into a 24-hour round-the-clock broadcasting service, in order to keep up with the pace of delivering news to its listeners, and came out with Kape at Balita, a morning news/commentary/talk show hosted by Bobby Guanzon and then GMA News reporter Jessica Soho in 1991, which expanded to television the same year.

1999–present: Super Radyo

On January 4, 1999, the station was once again rebranded as "Super Radyo DZBB 594". Much of their programming focuses on news and current events, and it still simulcasts GMA programs such as 24 Oras and Saksi.

In 2010, for the first time in Philippine radio history, DZBB and its rival station DZMM of ABS-CBN made history as they joined forces in the name of public service. Two children named James and Jesus asked for help to find their missing parents named Pascual and Norma Bantillan from Bohol on a rival program on DZMM Aksyon Ngayon Global Patrol and were eventually reunited through DZBB's program Aksyon Oro Mismo.

On February 28, 2011, DZBB began its simulcast on television with the launch of Dobol B sa News TV block, coinciding with the launch of GMA News TV. The block originally included the radio station's top-rated programs such as Saksi sa Dobol B and Super Balita sa Umaga Nationwide. It ended its simulcast on September 7, 2012.

In 2014, DZBB kept its winning streak in Mega Manila as it continued to lead rival stations in ratings, according to data from Nielsen Media Research. DZBB grabbed the lead in Mega Manila in June 2014 and has since sustained leadership in the area, which it repeated in 2017, 2019, and again from 2020 up to this day.

On April 24, 2017, DZBB officially launched its new logo, its first ever jingle for the station and its newly renovated radio booth, as well as the relaunch of Dobol B sa News TV, after almost five years of hiatus on television.

In 2020, DZBB temporarily suspended its regular programming, especially during overnight hours, in line with the enhanced community quarantine imposed by President Rodrigo Duterte due to the COVID-19 pandemic, which replaced them with news updates and hookup to sister station Barangay LS 97.1. The simulcasts of Barangay Love Stories provided to be quite a hit that later in the year DZBB responded with the launch of Super Radyo Nobela, which proved to be a stunning success also as the first drama program to be aired live on Facebook.

On February 8, 2021, the studios of DZBB, as well as the programs simulcast over Dobol B sa News TV (later renamed to  Dobol B TV with the launch of GTV), and its sister station Barangay LS 97.1, have permanently moved to its new radio booth at the GMA Network Annex Building.

Programming

DZBB's programs are mostly news, current issues, and news analysis produced by the GMA News and Public Affairs department. Their morning radio shows are anchored mostly by news anchors and personalities from television.

The station also has two kinds of newscasts: a main news bulletin entitled Super Balita with editions of the news bulletin aired at 7:00 a.m. PST, 11:30 a.m. PST (the weekday editions of its morning and lunchtime newscasts are simulcast to all Super Radyo stations nationwide), 3:30 p.m. PST and 10:00 p.m. PST every Monday to Friday and Bigtime Balita, the flagship evening newscast of the station, anchored by Rene Sta. Cruz aired before the simulcast of 24 Oras from GMA Network.

On some occasions, DZBB would also air live and exclusive blow-by-blow boxing coverage, especially during Manny Pacquiao's fights (alongside Super Radyo stations nationwide). As such, DZBB became the first radio station to do so (until 2019, and again in 2021).

As of 2020, DZBB also live streams select programs on its official Facebook page.

On January 23, 2023, DZBB added a simulcast of the showbiz-oriented talk show Fast Talk with Boy Abunda, also from GMA Network.

Notable anchors

Current
 Mike Enriquez
 Arnold Clavio
 Connie Sison
 Susan Enriquez
 Mel Tiangco
 Vicky Morales
 Pia Arcangel
 Ivan Mayrina
 Kim Atienza
 Boy Abunda
 Joel Reyes Zobel

Former
 Ali Sotto 
 Robert "Uncle Bob" Stewart
 Inday Badiday
 Johnny Midnight
 German Moreno
 Jay Sonza 
 Helen Vela
 Gina de Venecia 
 Bobby Guanzon
 Jessica Soho 
 Eddie Ilarde
 Manolo Favis 
 Joey De Leon 
 Julius Babao
 Bea Binene

See also
GMA Network
GTV
GMA News and Public Affairs
Barangay LS 97.1
Dobol B TV

References

External links
Media Ownership Monitor Philippines  – Radio by VERA Files and Reporters Without Borders
GMA Network corporate history
PinoyTV records about GMA and DZBB

Super Radyo stations
Radio stations in Metro Manila
Radio stations established in 1950
1950 establishments in the Philippines
News and talk radio stations in the Philippines